Beamforming is a signal processing technique used to spatially select propagating waves (most notably acoustic and electromagnetic waves). In order to implement beamforming on digital hardware the received signals need to be discretized. This introduces quantization error, perturbing the array pattern. For this reason, the sample rate must be generally much greater than the Nyquist rate.

Introduction 
Beamforming aims to solve the problem of filtering signals coming from a certain direction as opposed to an omni-directional approach. Discrete-time beamforming is primarily of interest in the fields of seismology, acoustics, sonar and low frequency wireless communications. Antennas regularly make use of beamforming but it is mostly contained within the analog domain.

Beamforming begins with an array of sensors to detect a 4-D signal (3 physical dimensions and time). A 4-D signal  exists in the spatial domain at position  and at time . The 4-D Fourier transform of the signal yields  which exists in the wavenumber-frequency spectrum. The wavenumber vector  represents the 3-D spatial frequency and  represents the temporal frequency. The 4-D sinusoid , where  denotes the transpose of the vector , can be rewritten as  where  , also known as the slowness vector.

Steering the beam in a particular direction requires that all the sensors add in phase to the particular direction of interest. In order for each sensor to add in phase, each sensor will have a respective delay  such that  is the delay of the ith sensor at position  and where the direction of the slowness vector  is the direction of interest.

Discrete-time weighted delay-and-sum beamforming 
The discrete-time beamformer output  is formed by sampling the receiver signal   and averaging its weighted and delayed versions.

where:
  is the number of sensors
  are the weights
  is the sampling period
  is the steering delay for the ith sensor
Setting  equal to  would achieve the proper direction but  must be an integer. In most cases  will need to be quantized and errors will be introduced. The array pattern for a desired direction given by the slowness vector  and for a quantization error  becomes:

Interpolation 

The fundamental problem of discrete weighted delay-and-sum beamforming is quantization of the steering delay. The interpolation method aims to solve this problem by upsampling the receiving signal.  must still be an integer but it now has a finer control. Interpolation comes at the cost of more computation. The beamformer output  is now

The sampling period ratio  is set to an integer to minimize the increase in computations. The samples  are interpolated from  such that

After  is upsampled and filtered, the beamformer output  becomes:

At this point the beamformer's sample rate is greater than the highest frequency it contains.

Frequency-domain beamforming 
As seen in the discrete-time domain beamforming section, the weighted delay-and-sum method is effective and compact. Unfortunately quantization errors can perturb the array pattern enough to cause complications. The interpolation technique reduces the array pattern perturbations at the cost of a higher sampling rate and more computations on digital hardware. Frequency-domain beamforming does not require a higher sampling rate which makes the method more computationally efficient.

The discrete-time frequency-domain beamformer is given by

For linearly spaced sensor arrays . In order to be computationally efficient it is desirable to evaluate the sum in as few calculations as possible. For simplicity  moving forward. If   for  then  becomes:

where . Substituting the 1-D FFT into the frequency-domain beamformer:

The term in brackets is the 2-D DFT with the opposite sign in the exponential

For a 1-D linear array along the horizontal direction and a desired direction:

where: 
  is the sensor separation 
 and  can be selected to "steer the beam" towards a certain temporal frequency and spatial position

References 

Digital signal processing